Mamadou Sarr (11 August 1938 – 18 June 2022) was a Senegalese sprinter. He competed in the men's 4 × 400 metres relay at the 1968 Summer Olympics.

References

External links
 

1938 births
2022 deaths
Athletes (track and field) at the 1964 Summer Olympics
Athletes (track and field) at the 1968 Summer Olympics
Senegalese male sprinters
Senegalese male hurdlers
Olympic athletes of Senegal
African Games medalists in athletics (track and field)
African Games silver medalists for Senegal
Athletes (track and field) at the 1965 All-Africa Games
Sportspeople from Saint-Louis, Senegal